The following lists events that happened in 1964 in Libya.

Incumbents
Monarch: Idris 
Prime Minister: Mohieddin Fikini (until January 20), Mahmud al-Muntasir (starting January 20)

Events
 Libyan general election, 1964

 
Years of the 20th century in Libya
Libya
Libya
1960s in Libya